Ernest Jombla (born 4 October 1992) is a Sierra Leonean squash player. He made his Commonwealth Games debut by representing Sierra Leone at the Commonwealth Games in 2018.

References

1992 births
Living people
Sierra Leonean male squash players
Squash players at the 2018 Commonwealth Games
Commonwealth Games competitors for Sierra Leone